Suzanne Diskeuve is a Belgian figure skater who competed in pair skating.

With partner Edmond Verbustel, in 1947 she won bronze medals at both the European Figure Skating Championships (in Davos) and the World Figure Skating Championships (in Stockholm).

Competitive highlights 
With  Edmond Verbustel

References 

Belgian pair skaters
Living people
Year of birth missing (living people)